The Neustadt Dam, also known as the Nordhausen Dam ( or Nordhäuser Talsperre), is the oldest dam in the Free State of Thuringia in Germany. It supplies drinking water to the town of Nordhausen. 
The dam is a curved gravity dam made of rubble stone, based on the Intze Principle. The dam was built in 1904–1905, in the southern Harz mountains, and it was raised by a further 6.26 metres in 1922–1923. The impounded stream is the Krebsbach. The operator of the dam is the Thüringer Fernwasserversorgung; the water is supplied to the Wasserverband Nordhausen (Nordhausen Water Association).

Swimming and water sports are not permitted on the lake, but there is a public path around the lakeshore.

The dam was refurbished between 1997 and 2001. It was reinforced, waterproofed on the upstream side with asphaltic concrete, and given an inspection walkway and an impervious blanket.

On the western side of the valley is a checkpoint (no. 218) in the Harzer Wandernadel hiking system.

See also 
 List of dams and reservoirs in Germany
 List of dams in the Harz

External links 
 Information about the Wasserverband Nordhausen
 Dam operator
 Information on the refurbishment (pdf file; 106 kB)
 Nordhausen Dam

Dams in the Harz
Dams in Thuringia
Buildings and structures in Nordhausen (district)
RNeustadt 
Dams completed in 1905
1905 establishments in Germany